André Lajoinie (born 29 December, 1929 in Chasteaux, Corrèze) is a French politician and a member of the French Communist Party (PCF).

He was a member of the French National Assembly for Allier from 1978 to 1993, then from 1997 to 2002, and was president of the Communist caucus in the Assembly from 1981 to 1993.  He was the deputy for Allier's 3rd constituency in the 6th, 7th, 9th and 11th legislatures, and one of four deputies from Allier in the 8th legislature.

A close collaborator of party leader Georges Marchais, he was chosen to be the PCF's candidate in the 1988 presidential election. A rather mediocre public speaker, Lajoinie proved to be an uncharismatic candidate, and was lampooned by humorists who caricatured him as a dimwit. His voting share of 6.8% was considered an unusually mediocre result for PCF standards. Lajoinie retired from active politics in 2002.

References

1929 births
Living people
People from Corrèze
French Communist Party politicians
Candidates in the 1988 French presidential election
Deputies of the 11th National Assembly of the French Fifth Republic